Murias is one of eleven parishes (administrative divisions)  in Candamo, a municipality within the province and autonomous community of Asturias, in northern Spain. 

Villages
 Agüera 
 Bohles 
 El Caleyo 
 Figaredo 
 Murias 
 Sandiche 
 Villamarin 
 Villar

References

Parishes in Candamo